Antonio Broso (born 25 February 1991) is an Italian professional football player who plays for Fano.

Club career
He made his Serie C debut for Ravenna on 15 October 2017 in a game against FeralpiSalò.

Ahead of the 2019–20 season, Broso joined Clodiense. He left the club in December 2019, to join fellow league club Legnago Salus.

References

External links
 Antonio Broso on Calciatori.com 
 

1991 births
People from Vibo Valentia
Living people
Italian footballers
Association football forwards
F.C. Crotone players
A.C.R. Messina players
S.S. Ebolitana 1925 players
Giulianova Calcio players
S.S. Chieti Calcio players
Ravenna F.C. players
A.C. Reggiana 1919 players
Alma Juventus Fano 1906 players
Serie C players
Serie D players
Sportspeople from the Province of Vibo Valentia
Footballers from Calabria